Sir Richard Osborne, 2nd Baronet, MP (1618 – 2 March 1685) was an Irish baronet and politician.

Biography
Osborne was admitted to Gray's Inn in 1628 and sat as a Member of Parliament for Dungarvan in the Irish House of Commons between 1639 and 1649.

The eldest surviving son of Sir Richard Osborne and wife Mary daughter of Roger Dalton, of Knockmahon, he succeeded his father in the baronetcy in 1667 and served as High Sheriff of County Waterford for 1671–72.

Marriage and issue
Sir Richard Osborne and Elizabeth née Carew had two sons and three daughters:
 Sir John Osborne, 3rd Baronet (1659 – 4 April 1713), succeeded in the baronetcy on 2 March 1685, married in 1699 Elizabeth Walsingham (died 22 February 1733), daughter of Colonel Thomas Walsingham, of Scadbury, Kent and wife Lady Anne Howard, without issue. He is buried in the nave of the Parish Church of St Mary The Virgin, Saffron Walden.
 Sir Richard Osborne, 4th Baronet (c. 1662 – October 1713), succeeded in the baronetcy on 4 April 1713, unmarried without issue
 Grace Osborne, married as his second wife Lieutenant-Colonel Beverley Ussher, of Ballyfin, Co. Cork (died 1683), 5th son of Arthur Ussher MP, of Donnybrook, Co. Dublin and wife Judith daughter of Sir Robert Newcomen, and had issue: including John Ussher MP and the Dukes of Leinster
 Elizabeth Osborne, married the Very Rev Arthur Pomeroy (1623 – 1708), and had issue: including Arthur Pomeroy, 1st Viscount Harberton
 Anne Osborne, married in 1678 Captain Charles Odell, of Castletown, Co. Limerick

See also
 Burke's Peerage & Baronetage
 Parliament of Ireland

References

External links
 www.thepeerage.com

1618 births
Members of Gray's Inn
Members of the Parliament of Ireland (pre-1801) for County Waterford constituencies
High Sheriffs of County Waterford
1685 deaths
Osborne baronets
Irish MPs 1639–1649